Third Carrickfergus Silver Band commonly shortened to Third Carrick Band are a championship section silver band from Carrickfergus in Northern Ireland.

Musical conductors
 DJ McCartney: 1958–1968, 1973–1974
 Windsor Hylands: 1974-1974
 Alan Murdock : 1982–1985
 Desmond Graham: 1986–present

Current principal players
Soprano Cornet – Jackie Moore
Principal Cornet – Claire Hueston
Flugel Horn – Ruth Binding
Tenor Horn – Fergus Grant
Solo Euphonium – Peter Graham
Solo Trombone – William Johnston
Eb Bass – Allan Davison
Bb Bass – Roy Bennett
Percussion – Matthew Brown

Recordings

In June 2009 the band recorded a CD named "On the Castle Green". The CD was released on Monday 9 November 2009 featuring 18 tracks of various genres including jazz and blues, religious, swing and classical. The CD also features the first recording of the march composed by Paul Lovatt-Cooper on the commission by the band for their 50th anniversary celebrations in Autumn 2008. This is the band's first CD and is initially available at the cost of £10.

Junior band
In the late 1990s the 'new' junior band was formed to train musicians for the senior band. This has proved successful with nine members of Third Carrickfergus Silver Band having been promoted from the Junior Band. The junior band is split into three smaller bands in consideration of individual's ability: the "Beginner Band", the "Training Band" and the "Junior Band"; from complete beginners to more accomplished players respectively. These bands are taken by members of the senior band. The bands compete in the BBL competition, Mossgrove and Carrickfergus festivals and for the first time in 2009 the NIBA Championships in the 5th Grade/Unaffiliated Class.

References

External links
Third Carrick Band

Musical groups established in 1958
Carrickfergus
British brass bands
Musical groups from Northern Ireland
1958 establishments in Northern Ireland